Ross Harrison may refer to:

Ross Granville Harrison (1870–1959), US biologist and anatomist
Ross Harrison (academic) (born 1943), British philosopher and academic
Ross Harrison (rugby union) (born 1992), British rugby union player